Aidia cochinchinensis is the type species of Aidia: a plant in the family Rubiaceae; no subspecies are listed in the Catalogue of Life.

In the Marshall Islands it is known as kielomar.

References

External links 
 

Gardenieae
Flora of Indo-China